Alexander Hamilton-Gordon may refer to:

Alexander Hamilton-Gordon (British Army officer, born 1817) (died 1890), soldier and MP
Alexander Hamilton-Gordon (British Army officer, born 1859) (died 1939), soldier, son of the above

See also
Alexander Hamilton (disambiguation)
Alexander Gordon (disambiguation)